Chang Dingqiu (born January 1967) is a general (shangjiang) of the People's Liberation Army (PLA) serving as Commander of the People's Liberation Army Air Force, succeeding Ding Laihang in September 2021. He is a member of the 20th Central Committee of the Chinese Communist Party and was an alternate member of the 19th Central Committee of the Chinese Communist Party.

Biography
Chang was born in Hengyang County, Hengyang, Hunan province in 1967. He enlisted in the People's Liberation Army Air Force in 1984. He served as assistant chief of staff of the People's Liberation Army Air Force in 2011 before being appointed chief of staff of Shenyang Military Region Air Force. In January 2016, he was promoted to become deputy commander of the newly founded Southern Theater Command, and served until December 2017, when he was appointed deputy chief of staff of the Joint Staff Department of the Central Military Commission. In August 2021, he rose to become commander of People's Liberation Army Air Force, succeeding Ding Laihang.

He was promoted to the rank of major general (shaojiang) in July 2012, lieutenant general (zhongjiang) in July 2018 and general (shangjiang) in September 2021.

References

1967 births
Living people
People from Hengyang
People's Liberation Army Air Force generals
Commanders of the People's Liberation Army Air Force
People's Liberation Army generals from Hunan
Members of the 20th Central Committee of the Chinese Communist Party